Ron St. Angelo (born 1948) is an American photographer who has been the official photographer of the Dallas Cowboys since 1979. He has photographed athletes, such as Emmitt Smith, Troy Aikman, Michael Irvin, and Herschel Walker; Dallas Cowboys Cheerleaders; coaches Tom Landry and Jimmy Johnson; General Manager Texas E. "Tex" Schramm; and President and General Manager Jerry Jones.  He has published several books, including Greatest Team Ever, which featured a cover photograph of the "Triplets".

Early life 
Born in Beaumont, Texas, Ron St. Angelo helped start the photography department at Beaumont High School in 1965, constructing a lab and darkroom to process film and print black-and-white prints. Upon graduating in 1967, St. Angelo enlisted in the United States Navy.
In 1968, as Boatswain's Mate stationed on a Man-O-War U.S. Destroyer based out of Naval Station Long Beach, California, he served two combat tours of duty in the Vietnam War and was decorated for his service. After his honorable discharge from military service in 1973, St. Angelo returned to Houston and majored in philosophy at the University of Houston. In 1976, he began working for Gittings Portrait Studio in Houston and Dallas; photographer Arthur Heitzman mentored him. In 1978, he opened his own professional photography studio, St. Angelo Photography.

After 1978 
From 1978 he has photographed musicians for Wild West Productions including Rolling Stones, Beyonce, and Neil Young.  In 1979, the Dallas Cowboys hired him to photograph all aspects of the team, from Dallas Cowboys Cheerleaders, led by Suzanne Mitchell and choreographer "Texie" Waterman, to game action, coaches, and front office officials.  He continued that role through three World Championship wins and the Cowboys' becoming the Team of the Decade with multiple future NFL Hall of Famers.

St. Angelo also photographed for commercial and advertising clients like Rolls-Royce, The Houstonian and President George H.W. Bush.

In 1989 the Professional Photographers Association of China invited him to present his work, and he earned a Master of Photography.  In 2002, he received a nomination for a Pulitzer Prize in Journalism.  In 2004, Nikon Camera honored him for his work and featured him in their Legends Behind the Lens.

In 2007 he became an adjunct professor of photography at the Art Institute of Dallas, and he served as board president of the Photographers Advisory Board.

In 2009 he worked for the Roman Catholic diocese of Dallas, publishing four books over the course of 12 years, including Kevin Joseph Cardinal Farrell and the Cathedral Shrine of the Virgin of Guadalupe in 2011.

Exhibitions 
St. Angelo's photographs are on permanent exhibit at AT&T Stadium, Arlington, Texas, home of the Dallas Cowboys.  The Star, Dallas Cowboys Headquarters in Frisco, Texas.
His work was exhibited at Cathedral Guadalupe on the publication of his book, Dallas, Texas.  His work was exhibited at Eastman Kodak's Corporate Headquarters in Las Colinas, Texas.  Goodrich Gallery Presents Ron St. Angelo One-Man Show / February 1991.  He had a one-man show at the Club Corp Country Club in Irving, Texas in 2019.  One man show Stage West Theatre Fort Worth, Texas 2013.  The White House, Washington D.C. 2005.  ESPN Headquarters Las Colinas, Texas 2012.

Awards 
1989:  Master of Photography, Republic of China
1991:  Board Ten Thousand Eyes Project / 150th Anniversary of Photography Eastman Kodak
2002:  The National Academy of Television Arts & Sciences / Lone Star Chapter / Sports Emmy Documentary on Official Photographer Dallas Cowboys
2004:  Nikon Camera / Legends Behind the Lens
2009:  St. Angelo Signature Collection Dallas Cowboys Football Club

Personal 
St. Angelo is married to Joanna St. Angelo, executive director of the Sammons Center for the Performing Arts.

Gallery

Works

References

External links 
 Ron St. Angelo's personal website
 Ron St. Angelo background
 Ron St. Angelo's Dallas Cowboys Photos
 Getty Images Ron St. Angelo
 Dallas Cowboys Official Signature Collection
 Roman Catholic Diocese of Dallas Portfolio
 The St. Angelo Collection at The University of Dallas
 The Texas Catholic Special Article
 Mater Dei Catholic Church photographed by Ron St. Angelo
 Photos of Latin Mass Church photographed by Ron St. Angelo 
 A Tour of St. Thomas Aquinas photographed by Ron St. Angelo

1948 births
Living people
Sports photographers
Photographers from Texas
People from Beaumont, Texas